The 2003 Polish Film Awards ran on March 15, 2003. It was the 5th edition of Polish Film Awards: Eagles.

Awards nominees and winners
Winners are highlighted in boldface.

Best Film

 The Pianist - Roman Polanski, Robert Benmussa, Alain Sarde
 Anioł w Krakowie - Witold Beres
 Dzień świra - Juliusz Machulski, Włodzimierz Otulak
 Edi - Piotr Dzięcioł

Best Actor

 Dzień świra - Marek Kondrat
 Edi - Henryk Golebiewski
 The Pianist - Adrien Brody
 Tam i z powrotem - Janusz Gajos
 Zemsta - Janusz Gajos

Best Actress

 Chopin. Pragnienie miłości - Danuta Stenka
 Anioł w Krakowie - Ewa Kaim
 The Pianist - Emilia Fox
 Zemsta - Katarzyna Figura

Supporting Actor

 Edi - Jacek Braciak
 Anioł w Krakowie - Jerzy Trela
 The Pianist - Ed Stoppard
 Zemsta - Daniel Olbrychski

Supporting Actress

 Wtorek - Kinga Preis
	Anioł w Krakowie - Beata Schimscheiner
 Dzień świra - Janina Traczykówna
 The Pianist - Maureen Lipman
 Zemsta - Agata Buzek

Film Score

 The Pianist - Wojciech Kilar
 Dzień świra - Jerzy Satanowski
 Edi - Wojciech Lemanski
 Zemsta - Wojciech Kilar

Director
 The Pianist - Roman Polanski
	Dzień świra - Marek Koterski
 Edi - Piotr Trzaskalski
 Zemsta - Andrzej Wajda

Screenplay

 Dzień świra - Marek Koterski
	Edi - Wojciech Lepianka, Piotr Trzaskalski
 The Pianist - Ronald Harwood

Cinematography

 The Pianist - Paweł Edelman
 Edi - Krzysztof Ptak

Costume Design

 The Pianist - Anna B. Sheppard
 Chopin. Pragnienie miłości - Magdalena Biernawska-Teslawska, Paweł Grabarczyk
 Dzień świra - Ewa Krauze
 The Revenge - Krystyna Zachwatowicz, Magdalena Biedrzycka
 Kariera Nikosia Dyzmy - Małgorzata Braszka

Sound

 The Pianist - Jean-Marie Blondel
 Chopin. Pragnienie miłości - Nikodem Wolk-Laniewski
 Edi - Jan Freda

Editing

 The Pianist - Hervé de Luze
 Dzień świra - Ewa Smal
 Edi - Cezary Kowalczuk
 Zemsta - Wanda Zeman

Production Design

 The Pianist - Allan Starski
 Chopin. Pragnienie miłości - Andrzej Przedworski
 Edi - Wojciech Zogala

Special awards

 Life Achievement Award: Roman Polanski
 Special Award: Jeremy Thomas, Jerzy Skolimowski
 Audience Award: Edi

External links
 2003 Polish Film Awards  at IMDb

Polish Film Awards ceremonies
Polish Film Awards
Polish Film Awards, 2003